The Death of Major Peirson, 6 January 1781 is a 1783 large oil painting by John Singleton Copley.  It depicts the death of Major Francis Peirson at the Battle of Jersey on 6 January 1781.

Background
The Battle of Jersey was the last French attempt to seize the island of Jersey, and one of the last battles with invading forces from a foreign nation in the British home islands.  The invasion was organized privately by Baron Philippe de Rullecourt but funded and supplied by the French government, and was intended to remove the threat that British naval vessels based in Jersey posed to American ships in the American Revolutionary War.

Approximately 1,000 French soldiers, commanded by de Rullecourt and an Indian, Mir Sayyad, landed at La Rocque, Grouville, overnight on 5–6 January. They occupied St Helier early on the morning of 6 January. They captured the Lieutenant Governor of Jersey, Moses Corbet, in bed. Although Corbet surrendered, Peirson, the 24-year-old commander of around 2,000 troops of the British garrison, refused to surrender. As Peirson organized a counter-attack, a French shot killed him. Lieutenant Philippe Dumaresq of the Jersey militia took command of the British forces, which comprised detachments of the 95th Regiment of Foot, 78th Highlanders, and Jersey Militia. The British forces quickly overwhelmed the French, most of whom surrendered.

Painting
The scene looks towards the final French resistance in Royal Square, viewed along what is now Peirson Place, with the French soldiers taking their last stand around the statue of George II. Further British reinforcements are visible on the hill at the top left. The statue and some of the buildings depicted still stand (some with bullet holes  caused by the battle).

Although Peirson was killed in the early stages of the battle, the painting shows Peirson (at the centre of the painting under the large Union Flag, supported by other officers) being shot down leading the final charge, giving him a more heroic role and fate. To the left, his black servant Pompey avenges his master by shooting the sniper. It is believed that the depictions of the officers supporting the stricken Peirson are true portraits; the black servant of auctioneer James Christie was the model for Pompey, although it is unclear whether a black servant played a role (there is no suggestion in contemporaneous sources). Copley modeled the civilians fleeing to the right on his wife, family nurse and children.

Peirson became a national hero, and the painting drew crowds when it was first exhibited at 28 Haymarket in May 1784, with admission charged at 1 shilling.  The Tate Gallery purchased the painting in 1864. Between 1989 and 2010, a copy appeared on the 10 Jersey pound note, and before that on the 1 pound note.

See also 
 The Death of General Montgomery in the Attack on Quebec, December 31, 1775 – painting by John Trumbull, contemporary of Copley

Notes

References

Citations

Bibliography
 The English school; G. Hamilton; Charles Tilt, 1833; p. 193-5

External links
 The Death of Major Peirson, 6 January 1781 at the Tate Gallery's official website
John Singleton Copley in America, a full text exhibition catalog from The Metropolitan Museum of Art, which contains material on the painting (fig. 10)

Paintings by John Singleton Copley
War paintings
Flags in art
Paintings about death
Paintings about the American Revolution
Collection of the Tate galleries
1783 paintings
Cultural depictions of British men
Cultural depictions of military officers
Paintings of people